Next Framework is a JavaScript framework for developing web applications  based on Spring and Hibernate. While originally developed and supported only in Portuguese language. An English worldwide version was created to be available in 2015 and since then has developed to be abel to use in multiple langues.

External links 
 Next Framework Website
 Next Framework Github page

JavaScript